Indian Mountain School is an independent coeducational boarding and day school for children grades pre-K through 9, located on two campuses in Lakeville, Connecticut, United States.

The school consists of Lower and Upper campus, with Lower Campus being for children in primary school (pre-k to fourth), while the Upper Campus is home to students grades 5 through 9. However, boarding is only available for students in grades six to nine.
Indian Mountain School is often abbreviated as IMS.

History
In 1916, Francis Behn Riggs purchased land and buildings on the site of the present Upper Campus. Educated at Groton and Harvard, Riggs founded an agricultural high school for boys, named the Riggs School. Indian Mountain School assumed its current name in 1922 when it became a boarding school designed to prepare boys for the entrance examinations of secondary boarding schools. Classes and dormitory space were located in a large building adjacent to and south of the present tennis courts; Hadden House served as a gymnasium and faculty housing. Indian Mountain School enrolled eight boys that first year ranging in age from eight to 14.

From these beginnings, Riggs gradually constructed the basis of today's school. His curriculum was a traditional one but also included such extras as carpentry and dramatics. The current motto, life through service was adopted from the original Riggs School and applied to the new Indian Mountain School. The farm continued to operate for the benefit of the school kitchen, and boys engaged in an active outdoor life. By 1928, the enrollment had reached 30 boys. In November 1928 the main school building was destroyed by fire but Riggs was able to raise the funds to construct the current brick building in time for the opening of school in September 1929, just months ahead of the Stock Market Crash. At the same time, the school was incorporated as a not-for-profit and chartered under the laws of Connecticut to “maintain forever a school for the training and education of boys and young men.” The new building, designed for 40 students and their instructors, was full that fall.

On July 1, 2003, Indian Mountain School merged with the neighboring pre-kindergarten through fourth grade school, formerly known as The Town Hill School.

The Town Hill School began in the 1930s as Mrs. Tracy's school, named for its founder, the wife of a Hotchkiss teacher. In 1938, a group of Hotchkiss parents and others in the community, convinced of the present and future need for a strong elementary school, founded The Town Hill School. Early benefactors provided funds for the original school building, and The Hotchkiss School donated the land. The school opened that first year with an enrollment of 22 children in grades one through eight. Miss Penelope Oyen was Town Hill's first headmistress. She was assisted by Connie Garrity, who became headmistress in 1942 and served Town Hill until her retirement in 1978.

The original two-room, two-teacher school had eight grades, which were divided into grades one through four and grades five to eight. In 1946, Indian Mountain School and Town Hill agreed that Indian Mountain would begin offering grades five through nine, while Town Hill would concentrate on grades kindergarten through four. A pre-kindergarten was established for the 1987–1988 school year.

Following Connie Garrity's retirement in 1978, the school had a series of short-lived heads of school until Judy Boynton became Head of School in 1992. Judy worked closely with trustees, faculty, and parents to increase enrollment, balance the budget, and improve curricular continuity. Enrollment stabilized between 55 and 65 full-time boys and girls. Judy Boynton resigned in 1997.

The school moved to its present 12-acre campus in August 1998. Subsequent to Judy Boynton's departure, there was another period of turnover in the heads of school until the merger with Indian Mountain was agreed in 2003. In 2004, Trish Hochstetter, became the Lower School Head, while continuing her role as the Learning Skills Specialist on the Lower Campus until she resigned in 2014. Rebekah Jordan is now the Head of the Lower School.

In July 2006, Mark A. Devey became Indian Mountain's eighth Head of School. Under Mr Devey's leadership, enrollment stabilized, the curriculum was further refined, and the school launched a $7 million capital campaign to finance the construction of a new dormitory building with additional faculty housing, (completed in 2012) and a new Student Center (completed in January 2014) as well as to add to the school's endowment.

Jody Soja became the ninth Head of School in July 2015.

The school incurred allegations of sexual abuse from the 70s and 80s. Suits were brought forth in the 90s and 2010s.

Arts
Also known as IMS, Indian Mountain School has established an arts program that offers opportunities for all students. They have created an "Electives" program, offering courses ranging from Film Production to Digital Photography to Ancient Greek to Monty Python. IMS puts on one musical (in the fall/early winter) and one play (in the winter). Recently, they have put on "Arsenic and Old Lace" and "The Wizard of Oz" (both 2005), "Fools" and "Damn Yankees" (both 2006), and most recently,"Harvey" by Mary Chase (2007). More than half of the students on the Upper Campus take individual music lessons and over 70 students take guitar. The Mountain Voices(a co-ed singing group for eighth & ninth graders), guitar, jazz band, rock band, percussion ensemble, string quartet, orchestra, drums, etc. For those who are not particularly interested in learning how to play an instrument, there is Music Appreciation.

Athletics
Indian Mountain School has a gymnasium, seven playing fields and three all-weather tennis courts to accommodate IMS athletes during the fall and spring seasons. A paddle tennis court is used for recreational purposes throughout all seasons. During the winter, athletes make use of the gymnasium, swimming pool, the basketball and squash courts, and the ice hockey rinks at The Hotchkiss School. Additionally, ski teams train and compete at Catamount Ski Area.

Notable alumni
 John G. Avildsen – director of The Karate Kid, The Karate Kid II, Rocky, Rocky V, Lean on Me, and The Power of One
 Douglas Tompkins – environmentalist, co-founder of two clothing companies: The North Face and ESPRIT.
 Addison O'Dea—Documentary filmmaker

See also
Preparatory school

References

External links 
 Indian Mountain School website
 The Association of Boarding Schools profile
 Indian Mountain School profile provided by schooltree.org

Educational institutions established in 1922
Private elementary schools in Connecticut
Salisbury, Connecticut
Schools in Litchfield County, Connecticut
1922 establishments in Connecticut